Oniric is a dark folk duo from Italy. Formed in 2005 by Carlo De Filippo and Gianvigo (Gianpiero Timbro), the band is under contract with Caustic Records since 2009.
Their sound is characterized by a mix of acoustic instruments (piano, accordion, acoustic guitars), synthesizers, electric guitars and interlaced vocals.

Discography 

2006 - Suggestioni (EP)
2006 - Destroy Paranoia (MCD)
2007 - Blessing (MCD)
2007 - Destroy Paranoia (MCD)
2008 - Boulevard Cinéma (EP)
2009 - Cabaret Syndrome (full-length)
2013 - Mannequins (full-length)

References

External links
 http://www.oniricband.org

Italian musical groups